England's community forests are afforestation-based regeneration projects which were established in the early 1990s. Each of them is a partnership between the Forestry Commission and the Countryside Agency, which are agencies of the British government, and the relevant local councils.

Most of the designated areas are close to large cities and contain large amounts of brownfield, underused and derelict land. When the forests were created the average forest cover in the designated areas was 6.9%, and the target is to increase this to 30% over about 30 years. As most of the land is in private ownership the schemes rely mainly on providing landowners with incentives to plant trees. However the forests contain areas of publicly accessible open land, and increasing public access is one of the objectives.

The table below lists the community forests. As some of them straddle county boundaries they are listed by region and town or city.

See also

References

External links
Community Forest Trust
Forest of Avon Trust

 
Conservation in England
Reforestation
Community-based forestry
1990s establishments in England
Types of formally designated forests